The Negotin Valley is a region in northeastern Serbia. It is isolated and distanced from other parts of Central Serbia. The Negotin Valley has unusual climatic features and hydropotential and geomorphologic sites.

The region is centered around the city of Negotin. However, the borders of the region are not firmly defined. To the east, it is delimited by the Danube and Timok rivers, and to the west, by the Veliki Greben and Deli Jovan mountains. However, there are no certain geographic features to the north or south. The southern border can be interpreted as the Jelašnička River, while the northern one extends to Reka. It is agreed that the region is made up of several main centers: Negotin, Brza Palanka and since World War I, Salaš and Brusnik.

It can be considered as a part of the Timok Valley.

See also
 Bulgarians in Serbia
 Romanians in Serbia

References

Timok Valley
Geographical regions of Serbia
Wine regions of Serbia